Himalmedia Private Limited is a periodical publisher in Nepal. Himalmedia publishes three premium periodicals: Himal Khabarpatrika, a Nepali-language fortnightly newsmagazine, Nepali Times, an English-language weekly newspaper, and Wave, also an English-language magazine aimed at teenagers.

External links
 Himalmedia homepage

Publishing companies of Nepal